Vladimir Kapirulin (born 10 September 1953) is a Soviet diver. He competed in two events at the 1972 Summer Olympics.

References

1953 births
Living people
Soviet male divers
Olympic divers of the Soviet Union
Divers at the 1972 Summer Olympics
Place of birth missing (living people)